was a village located in Kitaazumi District, Nagano Prefecture, Japan.

As of 2003, the village had an estimated population of 1,255 and a density of 18.95 persons per km². The total area was 66.21 km².

On January 1, 2006, Miasa, along with the village of Yasaka (also from Kitaazumi District), was merged into the expanded city of Ōmachi.

Miasa has a long tradition of producing hemp, which has been grown there since the Yayoi period, 2000 years ago. 

It is part of a Sister City exchange program with Mendocino, California. Each year, the Junior High from one country sends students to the school at the other for a two-week visit, enriching understanding of the different cultures.

Dissolved municipalities of Nagano Prefecture
Ōmachi, Nagano